St. Andrew Catholic Church is located in northeast Portland, Oregon's King neighborhood, United States. The church hosts two Spanish-language and one Mayan-language mass weekly, as of 2017.

History
The church hosted the annual national Maya conference in 2011. In 2019, parishioners marched in Portland's annual pride parade, despite Archbishop Alexander King Sample's preference otherwise.

References

External links
 
 

Churches in Portland, Oregon
King, Portland, Oregon
Roman Catholic churches in Oregon